The cinnamon-bellied flowerpiercer (Diglossa baritula) is a species of bird in the family Thraupidae. It is found in El Salvador, Guatemala, Honduras, and Mexico.

Its natural habitats are subtropical or tropical moist montane forests and heavily degraded former forest. It is a species known to be a nectar robber, apparently taking nectar while not pollinating the plant.

References

cinnamon-bellied flowerpiercer
Birds of Mexico
Birds of Guatemala
Birds of Honduras
cinnamon-bellied flowerpiercer
Taxonomy articles created by Polbot